(born July 25, 1950) is an anime director. After leaving Tokyo Designer Gakuin in the middle of his studies, he joined A Production (then known as Shin'ei Dōga). In 1982, with some of the staff producing Kaibutsu-kun (including Yoshinobu Sanada, Toshiyuki Honda, and Makoto Moriwaki), Fukutomi founded , now known as Studio Comet.

Projects as director
Listed alphabetically.
Art of Fighting
Battle Angel (OVA)
Captain Tsubasa J
Doraemon: Nobita's Dinosaur
Fatal Fury: Legend of the Hungry Wolf
Flint the Time Detective
Galactic Patrol Lensman
Highschool! Kimen-gumi
Kaibutsu-kun (2nd series)
Locke the Superman Witch Era
The Marshmallow Times
Old Master Q and his Little Water Margin Tale
Suzuka
Those Who Hunt Elves 2
Whistle!
Hello, Hiroshi and Utako (spin-off of Kaibutsu-kun) (from the end of 2010 at 2011)

External links
  Interview with Hiroshi Fukutomi and Toshiyuki Honda
 

Anime directors
1950 births
Living people
People from Kōchi Prefecture